Pangidipalle is a village panchayat in Chityal mandal in Jayashankar Bhupalpally district in the state of Andhra Pradesh in India.

Important information
Kasarla VenkatRaji Reddy was the first Sarpanch of Pangidipalle of Independent India.now leading sarpanch is binaveni shankar. The current MPTC is Madasi Mahender.

Geography

Location in Google Maps

Approximate co-ordinates: 18° 24' 18.39", 79° 37' 59.98"

References 

Villages in Jayashankar Bhupalpally district